The environment of China comprises diverse biotas, climates, and geologies. Rapid industrialization, population growth, and lax environmental oversight have caused many environmental issues and large-scale pollution.

Geology

Biota

Wildlife

Flora

Climate

Climate change

Protected areas of China

Environmental issues

Rapid industrialization, population growth, and lax environmental oversight have caused many environmental issues, such as large-scale pollution in China. As of 2013, Beijing, which lies in a topographic bowl, has significant industry, and heats with coal, is subject to air inversions resulting in extremely high levels of pollution in winter months.

In January 2013, fine airborne particulates that pose the largest health risks, rose as high as 993 micrograms per cubic meter in Beijing, compared with World Health Organization guidelines of no more than 25. The World Bank estimates that 16 of the world's most-polluted cities are located in China.

According to Jared Diamond, the six main categories of environmental problems of China are: air pollution, water problems, soil problems, habitat destruction, biodiversity loss and mega projects. Diamond also states that, "China is noted for the frequency, number, extent, and damage of its natural disasters".

Many of the Chinese citizens started to wonder if air pollution is the cause of the increase of lung cancer. This question began to rise because the citizens in China must constantly wear face masks to avoid breathing in the hazardous particles from their polluted skies. Some experts agree that it is the reason, but others say there isn't enough evidence. Wang Ning, deputy director of the Beijing Office for Prevention and Control, says he has seen a rise in a certain cancer called adenicarcinoma, which is a mucus that is seen as a side effect from pollution. China's lung cancer rate is 32% of the entire world's lung cancer patients. Meanwhile, as lung cancer increases, gastric, esophageal, and cervical cancer have all decreased in China.

See also
Environmental policy in China
Geographic Information Systems in China
Hot summer cold winter zone
Land use in China

References

Further reading
 Elvin, Mark. The retreat of the elephants: an environmental history of China (Yale University Press, 2004). excerpt
 Heijdra, Martin. "Texts, Space and Time: New Insights into Chinese Environmental History." Journal of the Economic and Social History of the Orient 42.4 (1999): 549-565.
 Maohong, Bao. "Environmental history in China." Environment and History (2004): 475-499. online

 Marks, Robert B. China: An environmental history (Rowman & Littlefield, 2017). excerpt